Crystalbrook is a rural locality in the Shire of Mareeba, Queensland, Australia. In the  Crystalbrook had a population of 11 people.

History
Between 2008 and 2013, all of the Shire of Mareeba (including Crystalbrook) was within the Tablelands Region.

In the  Crystalbrook had a population of 11 people.

Geography
The Tate River flows through from east to west. The Rocky Tate River forms a small part of the south-eastern boundary before flowing through to join the Tate in the centre of the locality.

Heritage listings 
Crystalbrook has a number of heritage-listed sites, including:
 Tate-Almaden Road: Fischerton Water Race

References

Shire of Mareeba
Localities in Queensland